Edgars Točs (born 29 November 1988) is a Latvian beach volleyball player. He made his debut appearance at the Olympics representing Latvia at the 2020 Summer Olympics.

Career 
In 2010, he competed in separate tournaments together with Toms Vanags and Toms Benjavs. He competed in 2012 along with Toms Šmēdiņš and Toms Benjavs. He then paired with Richard Finster and the duo played a total of 29 international ranked tournaments.

He then decided to pair with Mārtiņš Pļaviņš and competed in international competitions since December 2017. He paired along with Mārtiņš Pļaviņš won the Dela Beach Open in January 2018 which was part of the 2018 FIVB Beach Volleyball World Tour. In July 2019, he along with Mārtiņš Pļaviņš had a third-place finish in the Espinho Open which was part of the 2019 FIVB Beach Volleyball World Tour. He was awarded the Latvian Beach Volleyball Male Player of the Year in 2019 by the Latvian Volleyball Federation.

He also paired with Mārtiņš Pļaviņš and competed in the men's beach volleyball tournament at the 2020 Summer Olympics.

References

External links
 

1988 births
Living people
Latvian beach volleyball players
Men's beach volleyball players
Beach volleyball players at the 2020 Summer Olympics
Olympic beach volleyball players of Latvia
People from Madona
University of Daugavpils alumni